The 2022–23 Indian Super League playoffs was the ninth playoffs series of the Indian Super League. The playoffs began on 3 March 2023 and concluded with the final on 18 March.

The top two teams in regular season, Mumbai City and Hyderabad automatically qualified for the semi-finals. Teams finishing 3rd to 6th featured in a single-leg play-off to determine the other two semi-finalists. The semi-finals took place over two legs while the final was a one-off match the Fatorda Stadium in Margao.

The playoff champions, ATK Mohun Bagan, thus qualified for Indian playoffs for 2023–24 AFC competitions against Hyderabad, the champions of 2021–22 Indian Super League for a place in 2023–24 AFC Cup qualifying playoff round. If any one of them also win the 2023 Super Cup, then that team will qualify for the additional playoff for 2023–24 AFC Cup group stage, while the other team will automatically qualify for 2023–24 AFC Cup qualifying playoff round.

Season table

Teams
 Mumbai City
 Hyderabad
 Bengaluru
 ATK Mohun Bagan
 Kerala Blasters
 Odisha

Bracket

Semi-finals

Knockout

Semi-finals

2–2 on aggregate. Bengaluru won 9–8 on penalties.

0–0 on aggregate. ATK Mohun Bagan won 4–3 on penalties.

Final

Controversy

The first knockout match of the playoffs between Bengaluru and Kerala Blasters had a controversial ending. Kerala Blasters players were called off the pitch by head coach Ivan Vukomanović in protest after a controversial free-kick goal was awarded to Bengaluru in the seventh minute of extra time, scored by Sunil Chhetri. Kerala Blasters forfeited the match in disagreement with the decision and a win was awarded to Bengaluru.

References

2021–22 Indian Super League season